Miško Mirković (Serbian Cyrillic: Мишко Мирковић ; Turkish: Mert Meriç) (born 7 July 1966) is a former Serbian international footballer. He played all position of defensive and midfield position.

While playing in Turkey, he became a naturalized Turkish citizen and there he was known as Mert Meriç on his Turkish passport.

Mirković played the last edition of Yugoslav First League before he left for Turkish Süper Lig side Kocaelispor.

In September 2000, he was signed by Fenerbahçe S.K., to meet with Zoran Mirković, who signed in July.
Mirković played in Süper Lig until he joined Kocaelispor of TFF First League in August 2003.

On the international level he played two friendly matches for FR Yugoslavia, against Ghana and South Korea in June 1997.

Achievements
 1997 - Won Turkish Cup with Kocaelispor
 2001 - Won Turkish Super League with Fenerbahçe

References

External links
http://www.reprezentacija.rs/reprezentativci/Mirkovic_Misko.htm

http://www.tff.org/Default.aspx?pageId=526&kisiId=24438

1966 births
Living people
Yugoslav footballers
Serbian footballers
Turkish footballers
Serbian emigrants to Turkey
Serbian expatriate footballers
Serbia and Montenegro international footballers
OFK Beograd players
Fenerbahçe S.K. footballers
Kocaelispor footballers
Elazığspor footballers
Süper Lig players
Expatriate footballers in Turkey
Association football defenders
Place of birth missing (living people)
Naturalized citizens of Turkey
Serbia and Montenegro expatriate footballers
Serbia and Montenegro footballers
Serbia and Montenegro expatriate sportspeople in Turkey